Zinc finger protein GLI2 also known as GLI family zinc finger 2 is a protein that in humans is encoded by the GLI2 gene.  The protein encoded by this gene is a transcription factor.

GLI2 belongs to the C2H2-type zinc finger protein subclass of the Gli family. Members of this subclass are characterized as transcription factors which bind DNA through zinc finger motifs. These motifs contain conserved H-C links. Gli family zinc finger proteins are mediators of Sonic hedgehog (Shh) signaling and they are implicated as potent oncogenes in the embryonal carcinoma cell. The protein encoded by this gene localizes to the cytoplasm and activates patched Drosophila homolog (PTCH) gene expression. It is also thought to play a role during embryogenesis.

Isoforms
There are four isoforms: Gli2 alpha, beta, gamma and delta.

Structure 
C-terminal activator and N-terminal repressor regions have been identified in both Gli2 and Gli3. However, the N-terminal part of human Gli2 is much smaller than its mouse or frog homologs, suggesting that it may lack repressor function.

Function 
Gli2 affects ventroposterior mesodermal development by regulating at least three different genes; Wnt genes involved in morphogenesis, Brachyury genes involved in tissue specification and Xhox3 genes involved in positional information. The anti-apoptotic protein BCL-2 is up regulated by Gli2 and, to a lesser extent, Gli1 – but not Gli3, which may lead to carcinogenesis. Additionally, in the amphibian model organism Xenopus laevis, it has been shown that Gli2 plays a key role in the induction, specification, migration and differentiation of the neural crest. In this context, Gli2 is responding to the Indian Hedgehog signaling pathway.

It has been shown in mouse models that Gli1 can compensate for knocked out Gli2 function when expressed from the Gli2 locus.  This suggests that in mouse embryogenesis, Gli1 and Gli2 regulate a similar set of target genes. Mutations do develop later in development suggesting Gli1/Gli2 transcriptional regulation is context dependent. Gli2 and Gli3 are important in the formation and development of lung, trachea and oesophagus tissue during embryo development. Studies have also shown that GLI2 plays a dual role as activator of keratinocyte proliferation and repressor of
epidermal differentiation. There is a significant level of crosstalk and functional overlap between the Gli TFs.  Gli2 has been shown to compensate for the loss of Gli1 in transgenic Gli1-/- mice which are phenotypically normal. However, loss of Gli3 leads to abnormal patterning and loss of Gli2 affects the development of ventral cell types, most significantly in the floor plate.  Gli2 has been shown to compensate for Gli1 ventrally and Gli3 dorsally in transgenic mice. Gli2 null mice embryos develop neural tube defects which, can be rescued by overexpression of Gli1  (Jacob and Briscoe, 2003). Gli1 has been shown to induce the two GLI2 α/β isoforms.

Transgenic double homozygous Gli1-/- and Gli2-/- knockout mice display serious central nervous system and lung defects have small lungs, undescended testes, and a hopping gait as well as an extra postaxial nubbin on the limbs. Gli2-/- and Gli3-/- double homozygous transgenic mice are not viable and do not survive beyond embryonic level. These studies suggest overlapping roles for Gli1 with Gli2 and Gli2 with Gli3 in embryonic development.

Transgenic Gli1-/- and Gli2-/- mice have a similar phenotype to transgenic Gli1 gain of function mice.  This phenotype includes failure to thrive, early death, and a distended gut although no tumors form in transgenic Gli1-/- and Gli2-/- mice.  This could suggest that overexpression of human Gli1 in the mouse may have led to a dominant negative rather than a gain-of-function phenotype.

Transgenic mice over-expressing the transcription factor Gli2 under the K5 promoter in cutaneous keratinocytes develop multiple skin tumours on the ears, tail, trunk and dorsal aspect of the paw, resembling those of basal cell carcinoma (BCC).  Unlike Gli1 transgenic mice, Gli2 transgenic mice only developed BCC-like tumors.  Transgenic mice with N-terminal deletion of Gli2, developed the benign trichoblastomas, cylindromas and hamartomas but rarely developed BCCs. Gli2 is expressed in the
interfollicular epidermis and the outer root sheath of hair follicles in normal human skin. This is significant as Shh regulates hair follicle growth and morphogenesis.  When inappropriately activated causes hair follicle derived tumors, the most clinically significant being the BCC.

Of the four Gli2 isoforms the expression of Gli2beta mRNA was increased the most in BCCs.  Gli2beta is an isoform spliced at the first splicing site which contains a repression domain and consists of an intact activation domain.  Overexpression of this Gli2 splice variant may lead to the upregulation of the Shh signalling pathway, thereby inducing BCCs.

Clinical significance 

Mutations of the GLI2 gene are associated with several phenotypes including Greig cephalopolysyndactyly syndrome, Pallister–Hall syndrome, preaxial polydactyly type IV, postaxial polydactyly types A1 and B.

In human keratinocytes Gli2 activation upregulates a number of genes involved in cell cycle progression including E2F1, CCND1, CDC2 and CDC45L.  Gli2 is able to induce G1–S phase progression in contact-inhibited keratinocytes which may drive tumour development.

Although both Gli1 and Gl12 have been implicated it is unclear whether one or both are needed for carcinogenesis.   However, due to feed back loops, one may directly or indirectly induce the other.

Cis-regulatory catalog of GLI2 
Minhas et al. 2015 have recently elucidated a subset of cis-regulatory elements controlling GLI2 expression. They have shown that conserved non-coding elements (CNEs) from the intron of GLI2 gene act as tissue-specific enhancers and reporter gene expression induced by these elements correlates with previously reported endogenous gli2 expression in zebrafish. The regulatory activities of these elements are observed in several embryonic domains, including neural tube and pectoral fin.

References

External links 
 
 

Transcription factors